Rudolf Scheurer (May 25, 1925 – November 1, 2015) was a football (soccer) referee from Bettlach, most remembered for supervising four matches at the FIFA World Cup: two in 1970 and 1974. During his peak times, Scheurer was a high-profile referee: In 1970, he was nominated as linesman (assistant referee 1) in the final between Brazil and Italy. In 1974, he was awarded the opening game. Scheurer also whistled in 1970 and 1974 World Cup qualifiers, UEFA Euro 1972 qualifying, and many European club competition matches. After he retired from his active career, Scheurer served as chief of the Swiss soccer referees. He died on November 1, 2015.

References

External links

  Profile

1925 births
2015 deaths
Swiss football referees
FIFA World Cup referees
FIFA World Cup Final match officials
Place of birth missing
1974 FIFA World Cup referees
1970 FIFA World Cup referees